"Dancin' Fool" is a song written by Burton Cummings and Domenic Troiano and performed by The Guess Who.  The song was featured on their 1974 album, Flavours. The song was produced by Jack Richardson.

Chart performance
It reached #14 in Canada, #28 on the Billboard Hot 100, and #85 in Australia in 1975.  The song was also released in the United Kingdom as a single, but it did not chart.

References

1974 songs
1974 singles
Songs written by Burton Cummings
The Guess Who songs
Song recordings produced by Jack Richardson (record producer)
RCA Victor singles